Laurie Cohen is a British academic. She is a professor of work and organisation at the Nottingham University Business School. Cohen is the editor-in-chief of Work, Employment & Society.

She completed a B.A. at Colgate University. Cohen earned a postgraduate certificate and M.A. at Sheffield City Polytechnic and a Ph.D. at Sheffield Hallam University.

Selected works

References 

Academics of the University of Nottingham
Living people
Year of birth missing (living people)
Colgate University alumni
Alumni of Sheffield Hallam University
British women academics
Business and management journal editors